Childress, Virginia may refer to the following places in Virginia:
Childress, Goochland County, Virginia
Childress, Montgomery County, Virginia